Kyaukkyi may refer to:

Kyaukkyi Township, a township in Taungoo District, Bago Region, Myanmar
Kyaukkyi, Bago, a town in Kyaukkyi Township
Kyaukkyi, Bhamo, a village in Shwegu Township, Bhamo District, Kachin State, Myanmar